The Men's madison at the 2013 UCI Track Cycling World Championships was held on February 24. 17 teams participated in the contest.

Medalists

Results
The race was held at 15:35.

References

2013 UCI Track Cycling World Championships
UCI Track Cycling World Championships – Men's madison